Glenloth is a locality in Victoria, Australia, located approximately  from the regional centre of Bendigo.

Glenloth Post Office opened on 22 October 1879; Glenloth Railway Station Post Office opened on 1 March 1884. In 1910 the railway station office was renamed Glenloth, and Glenloth became Glenloth East.

References

Towns in Victoria (Australia)